Eucalyptus platycorys, commonly known as Boorabbin mallee, is a species of mallee, rarely a small tree, that is endemic to Western Australia. It has rough, dark grey, fibrous and flaky bark on the trunk, smooth greyish bark above, lance-shaped adult leaves, flower buds usually in group of three, creamy white flowers and cup-shaped to cylindrical fruit.

Description
It has rough, dark grey, fibrous and flaky bark on the lower part of the trunk, smooth greyish bark above that is shed in ribbons. Flowering mainly occurs from July to October and the flowers are creamy white. The fruit is a woody, cup-shaped to cylindrical capsule with the valves at rim level or below it.

Taxonomy and naming
Eucalyptus platycorys was first formally described in 1929 by Joseph Maiden and William Blakely in Maiden's book, A Critical Revision of the Genus Eucalyptus from material collected from Boorabbin by Alexander Morrison. The specific epithet (platycorys) is from ancient Greek, meaning "flat", "wide" or "broad" and "helmet", referring to the operculum that is wider than the hypanthium.

Distribution and habitat
Boorabbin mallee is found around sand lakes, on sandplains and sand dunes from Boorabbin to Ravensthorpe and east to the Fraser Range and the western part of the Great Victoria Desert.

Conservation status
This eucalypt is classified as "not threatened" by the Western Australian Government Department of Parks and Wildlife.

See also
List of Eucalyptus species

References

Eucalypts of Western Australia
platycorys
Myrtales of Australia
Plants described in 1929
Taxa named by Joseph Maiden
Taxa named by William Blakely